Desulfovibrio gabonensis is a moderately halophilic sulfate-reducing bacterium. Its cells are motile curved rods that have a single polar flagellum. Its type strain is SEBR 2840 (= DSM 10636).

References

Further reading
Staley, James T., et al. "Bergey’s manual of systematic bacteriology, vol. 3. "Williams and Wilkins, Baltimore, MD (2012).
Alsharhan, Abdulrahman S., and CHRISTOPHER G. St C. Kendall. "Introduction to Quaternary carbonate and evaporite sedimentary facies and their ancient analogues." Int. Assoc. Sedimentol. Spec. Publ 43 (2011): 1–10. 
Barton, Larry L., and W. Allan Hamilton, eds. Sulphate-reducing bacteria: Environmental and engineered systems. Cambridge University Press, 2007.

External links 

Type strain of Desulfovibrio gabonensis at BacDive -  the Bacterial Diversity Metadatabase

Bacteria described in 1996
Desulfovibrio